The Loon is the debut album of the Minneapolis-based band Tapes 'n Tapes. It was originally self-released by the band's own Ibid Records on October 28, 2005 on compact disc. On July 24, 2006, the album was released in the United Kingdom on XL Recordings, on both CD and vinyl.

The album was generally well received by music critics, and earned numerous comparisons to the Pixies and Pavement. Pitchfork Media gave the album a favorable review, and gave it a "Best New Music" commendation.

The songs "Insistor" and "Cowbell" were released as singles in 2006 on XL Recordings. "Insistor" is also featured in the soundtrack of the video game Major League Baseball 2K7. In late 2006, the band's song "Jakov's Suite" (the final song of the album) began appearing in a television commercial for Nissan. It also appears in the University of Oregon's basketball advertisements during the games.

Track listing
All songs written by Josh Grier.
 "Just Drums" – 3:44
 "The Illiad" – 2:15
 "Insistor" – 4:20
 "Crazy Eights" – 3:24
 "In Houston" – 4:04
 "Manitoba" – 4:12
 "Cowbell" – 2:33
 "10 Gallon Ascots" – 5:02
 "Omaha" – 3:32
 "Buckle" – 3:40
 "Jakov's Suite" – 4:37

References

Tapes 'n Tapes albums
2005 debut albums